Huffton is an unincorporated community in Brown County, in the U.S. state of South Dakota.

History
Huffton was originally called Foxton, and under the latter name was laid out circa 1880. A post office called Huffton was established in 1882, and remained in operation until 1962. The present name honors D. J. Huff, a first settler.

References

Unincorporated communities in Brown County, South Dakota
Unincorporated communities in South Dakota